Ning Menghua (born November 8, 1973 in Jianjialong, Shaodong county) is a Chinese sprint canoeist who competed in the early to mid-1990s. She won a bronze medal in the K-4 500 m event at the 1991 ICF Canoe Sprint World Championships in Paris.

Ning competed in two Olympic Games, she finished 5th at K-4 500 m, 7th at K-2 500 m in 1992 Barcelona Olympics; 8th at K-2 500 m in 1996 Atlanta Olympics. She also won the gold medalist at K-4 500 m in 1990 Beijing Asian Games. As a canoeing player, Ning competed in international games, including the World Championship, World Cup, invitational tournament and domestic competitions, she won 11 gold medalists, 9 silver medalists and 9 bronze medalists. Ning received many honors, He was awarded the Pace-setters of the New Long March of Hunan and National Woman Pace-setter in 1991. Currently Ning serves as a water sports coach in Wuhan Sports University.

References

Sports-reference.com profile

1973 births
Living people
People from Shaoyang
Sportspeople from Hunan
Chinese sports coaches
Olympic canoeists of China
Canoeists at the 1992 Summer Olympics
Canoeists at the 1996 Summer Olympics
Asian Games medalists in canoeing
Canoeists at the 1990 Asian Games
ICF Canoe Sprint World Championships medalists in kayak
Chinese female canoeists
Asian Games gold medalists for China
Medalists at the 1990 Asian Games